Thomas van Rhee (16 December 1634 – 31 March 1701) was a Governor of Dutch Ceylon.

Career 
In 1659, he arrived in Batavia in the Dutch East Indies. From 1674 until 1678, he worked in Negapatnam. He was appointed Governor of Dutch Ceylon on 19 June 1693, and held the post until 29 January 1695, when he became Council of India. He was succeeded by Gerrit de Heere.

Footnotes

External links 
 

1634 births
1701 deaths
17th-century Dutch colonial governors
Governors of Dutch Ceylon
People from Wijk bij Duurstede
Dutch East India Company people